The ladies' individual skating event was held as part of the figure skating at the 1936 Winter Olympics. It was the sixth appearance of the event, which had previously been held twice at the Summer Olympics in 1908 and 1920 and at all three Winter Games from 1924 onward. The competition was held from Tuesday, 11 February to Saturday, 15 February 1936. Twenty-six figure skaters from 13 nations competed.

Results
Sonja Henie successfully defended her 1928 and 1932 title again; making her the most successful female Olympic figure skater ever.

Referee:
  Walter Jakobsson

Judges:
  Charles M. Rotch
  C.L. Wilson
  Fritz Schober
  Henri Hoyoux
  August Anderberg
  Wilhelm Bayerle
  Ladislav Fürst

References

External links
 Official Olympic Report
 sports-reference
 

Figure skating at the 1936 Winter Olympics
1936 in figure skating
Fig
OLy